Barsum is a village in the Shamkir Rayon of Azerbaijan.

Yeprem Khan, the Armenian-Iranian revolutionary of the Iranianian constitutional revolution was born in Barsum.

References 

Populated places in Shamkir District
Elizavetpol Governorate